Heterothera serraria is a moth of the family Geometridae. It is found from  Fennoscandia, Denmark, Poland and the Baltic states to eastern Siberia.

The wingspan is 25–30 mm.

The larvae feed on Picea species, including Picea abies.

References

External links
Lepiforum.de

Cidariini
Moths of Europe